James Alfred Smith Senior (born May 19, 1931) is the Pastor Emeritus of the Allen Temple Baptist Church in Oakland, California. Ebony Magazine chose Smith to be one of the "Most Influential Black Americans" and was one of the magazine's Top 15 Greatest Black Preachers of 1993.

Early life 
Smith was born in Kansas City, Missouri to Amy Gates Smith and Clyde Anderson. Smith graduated from Kansas City's R.T. Coles High School in 1948. He obtained a license to preach that same year.

Personal life 
Smith is married to Reverend Bernestine Smith. Smith's first wife, Joanna Goodwin Smith, died in 2007. Smith's son, J. Alfred Smith Jr., now retired, was a Senior Pastor of the Allen Temple Baptist Church.

Education 
Smith earned a B.S. degree from Western Baptist College in elementary education in 1952. In 1959, he earned a bachelor's degree in Divinity from the University of Missouri, and in 1966 he earned a master's degree in “Theology, Church, and Community.” In 1972, he received a master's degree from the American Baptist Seminary in American Church History. In 1975, Smith received a Doctor of Ministry Degree from the Golden Gate Baptist Theological Seminary.

Honors 
Smith was named by Ebony Magazine as one of the Most Influential Black Americans for two years consecutively.  He was also named Outstanding Citizen of the Year by the Oakland Tribune in 1990. He was awarded the Lifetime Achievement Award by the Greenling Institute in 2001 and was named Humanitarian of the Year by the East Bay Agency for Children.
 
Smith was also named a Samuel DeWitt Proctor Conference Beautiful Are Their Feet Honoree in 2006.

Works 
Smith has written an autobiography, The Road to Jericho (2004). He is also the author of several other books including Speak Until Justice Wakes (2006), The Overflowing Heart (1987), and Preach On (1996).

References

1931 births
Living people
American clergy
People from Kansas City, Missouri
University of Missouri alumni